Paul Broekx (born 5 April 1953) is a Belgian sprint canoer who competed in the mid-1970s. He was eliminated in the semifinals of the K-4 1000 m event at the 1976 Summer Olympics in Montreal.

References
Sports-Reference.com profile

1953 births
Belgian male canoeists
Canoeists at the 1976 Summer Olympics
Living people
Olympic canoeists of Belgium
Place of birth missing (living people)